Aidin Elmi (born June 13, 1986) is an Indonesian footballer who currently plays for Persiram Raja Ampat in the Indonesia Super League.

Club statistics

References

External links

1989 births
Association football defenders
Living people
Indonesian footballers
Liga 1 (Indonesia) players
Persiram Raja Ampat players
Persiba Balikpapan players
Bontang F.C. players
People from Balikpapan
Sportspeople from East Kalimantan